The 1985 NAIA Division II football season, as part of the 1985 college football season in the United States and the 30th season of college football sponsored by the NAIA, was the 16th season of play of the NAIA's lower division for football.

The season was played from August to November 1985 and culminated in the 1985 NAIA Division II Football National Championship, played at the Lincoln Bowl near the campus of Pacific Lutheran University in Tacoma, Washington.

Wisconsin–La Crosse defeated Pacific Lutheran in the championship game, 24–7, to win their first NAIA national title. The Eagles won all three of their playoff games on the road.

Conference realignment

Conference changes
 The Columbia Football League began play this season, with the combined football membership of the former Evergreen (NAIA Division I) and Pacific Northwest (NAIA Division II) conferences. The new league had fourteen members from British Columbia, Oregon, and Washington.
 This was the final season for the Hoosier-Buckeye Conference. Most members would later join the NCAA Division III Indiana Collegiate Athletic Conference (now known as the Heartland Collegiate Athletic Conference), which began play in 1990.

Membership changes

Conference standings

Conference champions

Postseason

 ‡ Game played at Bowling Green, Ohio
 ‡‡ Game played at Vermillion, South Dakota

See also
 1985 NCAA Division I-A football season
 1985 NCAA Division I-AA football season
 1985 NCAA Division II football season
 1985 NCAA Division III football season

References

 
NAIA Football National Championship